Universytet is a station on the Kyiv Metro's Sviatoshynsko-Brovarska Line. The station was opened on 6 November 1960 as part of the first stage of the metro's construction. It is named after the Taras Shevchenko National University of Kyiv, which is located in direct proximity to the station itself.

Architecture
The station is a pylon trivault and is considered to be amongst the most beautiful stations in the system, and is currently the only one in Kyiv that is the closest in appearance to the famous Stalinist architecture used in the Moscow and Saint Petersburg Metros of the 1950s. It was designed by architects H.Holovka, M.Syrkin, Ye.Ivanov, Zh.Yegulashvili, L.Semenyuk and O.Lozynska. The red marbled pylons are adorned with white marble busts of famous scientists and Ukrainian literature poets, attributed to sculptors M.Dekermendzhi, A.Bilostotsky, V.Znoba, A.Kobalyov, Ye.Kuntsevych, M.Lysenko, P.Ostapenko, O.Suprun and A.Shapran.

The white marble friezes also decorate the pylons and lighting is achieved by hidden lamps in the niches of the central vault, and by lamps on the platforms. The walls are covered with orange tiles and the floor is made of various shades of granite arranged in a traditional Ukrainian ornament layout. In the end of the station is white marbled wall, before which a large statue of Vladimir Lenin used to sit. However this was dismantled in the early 1990s, making the station lose its original look.

The station's large vestibule (monument to architecture) is situated in the middle of the A.V. Fomin Botanical Garden with a gallery allowing direct access to the gardens or to Taras Shevchenko Boulevard. The escalator ride consists of two separate tunnels linked in between by a smaller hall.

2011 bomb scare
On 15 April 2011, a suspicious package was discovered at Universytet. The station was evacuated and Ukrainian Security Services investigated, determining that the package was not dangerous. The scare followed the 11 April 2011 Minsk Metro bombing.

2022 Russian invasion 
During the 2022 Russian invasion of Ukraine, Universytet station, along with other metro stations in Ukraine, was used as a bomb shelter.

Gallery

References

External links
 

Kyiv Metro stations
Railway stations opened in 1960
1960 establishments in Ukraine
Railway stations at university and college campuses